Márton Fucsovics was the defending champion but chose not to defend his title.

Hugo Dellien won the title after defeating Matteo Donati 6–4, 5–7, 6–4 in the final.

Seeds

Draw

Finals

Top half

Bottom half

External Links
Main Draw
Qualifying Draw

Internazionali di Tennis Città di Vicenza - Singles
2018 Singles
AON